This is a list of video games for the PlayStation 5 video game console that have sold or shipped at least one million copies.

List

References

External links

 
PlayStation 5
Best-selling PlayStation 5 video games